This is a List of National Historic Landmarks in North Carolina.

North Carolina has 39 National Historic Landmarks:

|}

See also

National Register of Historic Places listings in North Carolina
List of National Historic Landmarks by state

References

External links 

 

North Carolina
 
National Historic Landmarks